Jermaine Titano Benito Holwyn (born 16 April 1973) is a Dutch former footballer.

Career
Holwyn played for Amstelland, Zeeburgin, Abcoude and Ajax Amsterdam before being purchased by English First Division side Port Vale in May 1995 for a £5,000 fee. He made his debut in a friendly at Newcastle Town on 16 July 1995, but was stretchered off with cartilage and cruciate ligament damage to his knee after just ten minutes. After undergoing surgery in September 1995 he was sidelined for the rest of the season. He made his debut at Vale Park on 19 January 1997 in a 4–4 draw with Queens Park Rangers, scoring a 66th minute own goal as he inadvertently helped QPR recover a 4–0 deficit. He made just six further appearances in the 1996–97 season, before manager John Rudge allowed him to return to Holland with HFC Haarlem in 1998.

Career statistics
Source:

References

External links
 

Footballers from Amsterdam
Dutch footballers
Association football defenders
AFC Ajax players
Dutch expatriate footballers
Expatriate footballers in England
Port Vale F.C. players
HFC Haarlem players
FC Volendam players
Eerste Divisie players
English Football League players
1973 births
Living people